Caster was a Japanese brand of cigarettes that was owned and manufactured by Japan Tobacco.

History
The first Caster variant was launched on July 1, 1982 by the former "Nippon Monopoly Corporation".

Tobacco used in Caster cigarettes also used vanilla from Madagascar (Caster Frontier used chocolate fragrance). Over time, other variants were also introduced, such as Caster Mild, Caster Super Mild and Caster One.

In 2003, Caster Super Mild was released in Hiroshima prefecture with a limited edition design that emphasized the initial letter "C" of Caster.  In the summer of 2004, the 5-packs of Caster cigarettes were renewed, but the Mild and Super Mild packs were not renewed and were still using the old design.

In December 2007, all Caster variants got a new design, and the old logo and emblem were restored.

Since early April 2010, the cigarettes have an improved perfume balance and "D-spec" (the name of a low-odor cigarette) was introduced.

Caster Mild is the most popular variant, sometimes abbreviated as "Casemai" in Japanese.

After the 2011 Tōhoku earthquake and tsunami struck Japan, Japan Tobacco announced they would stop selling the Caster One,  and Caster Menthol variants. However, the original duty-free shop only packs of Caster Classic were renewed and were sold again.

The pack design changed again around the beginning of August 2012, as the emblem designed on the upper left became bigger.  In addition, "Frontier Light" was integrated into the Caster brand and renewed to "Caster Frontier One" (here the "D-spec" was not yet introduced, and the filter was also a common charcoal filter. The product was a dual charcoal filter bundle). In addition, it was renamed as "ERR 1" at the time of transition to the Winston brand.

In 2015, all Caster products except one were merged with the Winston brand, leaving only Gold Silk as the only remaining brand of Cigarette with the name Caster on it. Eventually, Gold Silk would also be discontinued in November 2016.

Advertisement
In the 1980s, Japan Tobacco created various poster advertisements in which famous actor Tatsuya Fuji appeared. "I'm me, this tastes like" was a slogan he used in those adverts.

In the 1990s, some television advertisements were also made to promote Caster cigarettes.

Some old telephone cards also had Caster advertisements on them.

Markets
Caster cigarettes were mainly sold in Japan, but were also sold in Singapore, Taiwan and South Korea.

Products
Below are all the variants of Caster cigarettes, with the levels of tar and nicotine included.

See also
Japan Tobacco
Smoking in Japan
Fashion brands

References

Japanese cigarette brands
Japan Tobacco brands